The Teodoro Brillantes Ancestral House is a historic residential building in Tayum, Abra, Philippines. Listed as Teodoro Brillantes House, the building is considered as a National Historical Landmark by the National Historical Commission of the Philippines.

It hosted a private museum which features artifacts of the Brillantes family, some dating back to the Spanish colonial era in the Philippines.

Currently however, the artifacts are now not displayed inside the historic residential building.

References

National Historical Landmarks of the Philippines
Buildings and structures in Abra (province)
Historic house museums in the Philippines